Italy's national under-20 rugby union team has competed in both the IRB Junior World Championship and IRB Junior World Rugby Trophy. They were one of four teams relegated in 2009 to the Junior World Trophy after finishing at the bottom of the tournament. They were again promoted to the 2011 IRB Junior World Championship after winning the 2010 IRB Junior World Rugby Trophy.

Italy finished in last place at the 2012 IRB Junior World Championship and has again been relegated to the Junior World Trophy for 2013. Then they won the 2013 IRB Junior World Rugby Trophy so Italy will participate in the 2014 IRB Junior World Championship that was to be played in New Zealand.

Squad
Squad to the 2023 Six Nations Under 20s Championship

Management
Massimo Brunello - Head Coach
Claudio Appiani - Team Manager
Victor Jimenez - Assistant Coach
Giacomo Vigna - Fitness Coach
Nicola Cordioli - Physiotherapist
Roberto Alessandrini - Team Doctor
Paolo Granata - Assistant Manager
Niccolo Gaetaniello - Video Analyst
Andrea Nicotra - Committee Member

Tournament Record

F.I.R. Academy
During the regular season, many players of Under-20 are selected to play for F.I.R. Academy "Ivan Francescato" of Parma (from 2018 to 2020 in Remedello, Brescia). This team played in Italian Serie A, Pool A, until 2021-2021 season.

References

under-20
European national under-20 rugby union teams

es:Selección juvenil de rugby de Italia